Le Quotidien Jurassien is a Swiss French language regional daily newspaper published in the Jura canton, Switzerland.

History and profile
Le Quotidien Jurassien was founded in 1993 following the merger of the newspapers Le Pays and Le Démocrate. The paper is based in Delémont and published by Editions D+P SA. As of 2012 the paper was described as a leftist publication.

In 1997 Le Quotidien Jurassien had a circulation of 24,821 copies. In the first half of 2008 the paper had a readership of 48,000 and it was 44,000 in the second half.

References

External links
 
 

1993 establishments in Switzerland
Daily newspapers published in Switzerland
French-language newspapers published in Switzerland
Mass media in Delémont
Newspapers established in 1993